Nederrijn ("Lower Rhine"; distinct from the Lower Rhine or Niederrhein further upstream) is the Dutch part of the Rhine from the confluence at the town of Angeren of the cut-off Rhine bend of Oude Rijn (Gelderland) and the Pannerdens Kanaal (which was dug to form the new connection between the Waal and Nederrijn branches). The city of Arnhem lies on the right (north) bank of the Nederrijn, just past the point where the IJssel branches off. The Nederrijn flows on to the city of Wijk bij Duurstede, from where it continues as the Lek. The once-important but now small Kromme Rijn branch (in Roman times part of the Limes Germanicus and border river of the Roman Empire) carries the name "Rhine" towards the city of Utrecht.

From the city of Utrecht Kromme Rijn forks into the Vecht to the north, and into the Oude Rijn (Utrecht and South Holland) to the west. The first part is channelised and known as Leidse Rijn (Leiden Rhine), after the railway bridge near Harmelen (municipality Woerden) it's known as Oude Rijn, flowing westward to the North Sea.

In order to regulate the distribution of drainage between the different branches of the Rhine, several dams have been constructed. If the dams are closed, there is little flow in the Nederrijn and most of the water is drained by the IJssel. As for the Old Rhine, close to the North Sea a pumping station prevents the river for sea tides and silting.

Bridges over the Nederrijn are in Arnhem (railway and three road bridges), in Heteren (A50) and Rhenen. Ferries are found near Doorwerth, Wageningen, Opheusden, Elst and Amerongen.

History

In 1530, the Rhine near Arnhem was moved, a project that was completed in 1536. The city, which originated along the St. Jansbeek ("St. John's Brook'), could develop better now that it was closer to the river, and was also more easily defended against Habsburg expansionism into Guelders.

Gallery

See also
 Lower Rhine
 Rhine delta

References

Rivers of the Rhine–Meuse–Scheldt delta
Arnhem
Rhenen
Wageningen
Rivers of Gelderland
Rivers of Utrecht (province)
Rivers of the Netherlands
Distributaries of Europe